Daniel Ward Connolly (April 24, 1847 – December 4, 1894) was an American lawyer and politician who served one term as a Democratic member of the U.S. House of Representatives from Pennsylvania from 1883 to 1885.

Life and career
Daniel Connolly was born in Cochecton, New York, and moved with his parents to Scranton, Pennsylvania, in 1849.  he attended the local schools, studied law, and was admitted to the bar in June, 1870.  Connolly practiced law in Scranton.

He was elected president judge of Lackawanna County in 1878 but did not serve because the State supreme court held that there was no vacancy. He was an unsuccessful candidate for election to Congress in 1880.

Congress
In 1882, he was elected as a Democrat to the 48th Congress (March 4, 1883 – March 3, 1885).  He was unsuccessful candidate for reelection in 1884.

Later career and death 
After serving in Congress, he was appointed postmaster of Scranton; he served from May 2, 1885 to March 29, 1889.

Connolly died in Scranton on December 4, 1894, and was buried at Forest Hill Cemetery in Scranton.

Sources

1847 births
1894 deaths
Politicians from Scranton, Pennsylvania
Democratic Party members of the United States House of Representatives from Pennsylvania
People from Cochecton, New York
19th-century American politicians